Monte may refer to:

Places

Argentina
 Argentine Monte, an ecoregion
 Monte Desert
 Monte Partido, a partido in Buenos Aires Province

Italy
 Monte Bregagno
 Monte Cassino
 Montecorvino (disambiguation)
 Montefalcione

Portugal
 Monte (Funchal), a civil parish in the municipality of Funchal 
 Monte, a civil parish in the municipality of Fafe
 Monte, a civil parish in the municipality of Murtosa
 Monte, a civil parish in the municipality of Terras de Bouro

Elsewhere
 Monte, Haute-Corse, a commune in Corsica, France
 Monte, Switzerland, a village in the municipality Castel San Pietro, Ticino, Switzerland
 Monte, U.S. Virgin Islands, a neighborhood
 Monte Lake, British Columbia, Canada

Arts, entertainment, and media
 Monte (film), a 2016 drama film by Amir Naderi
 Three-card Monte
 Monte Bank or Monte, a card game

Other uses
 Monte (dessert) a milk cream dessert produced by the German dairy company Zott
 Monte (mascot), the mascot of the University of Montana
 Monte (name), including a list of people with the name

See also
 Del Monte (disambiguation)
 El Monte, California, United States
 El Monte, Chile
 La Monte, Missouri, United States
 LaMonte, a given name and surname
 Mont (disambiguation)
 Monte Berico, a cathedral in Vicenza, Italy
 Monte Carlo, Monaco
 Monte Cristo (disambiguation)
 Monti (disambiguation)
 Montie (disambiguation)
 Monty (disambiguation)